This is a list of fantasy anime television series, films, and OVAs. Titles are in alphabetical order.

0–9
 3×3 Eyes
 07-Ghost
 10 Tokyo Warriors
 11eyes

A
 Absolute Duo
 Ah My Buddha
 Air
 Ajin: Demi-Human
 Akahori Gedou Hour Rabuge
 Akame ga Kill!
 Akatsuki no Yona: Yona of the Dawn
 Akazukin Chacha 
 Amatsuki
 Amon Saga
 The Ancient Magus' Bride
 Angel Beats!
 Angel Sanctuary
 Angel Tales
 Angelique
 Anohana: The Flower We Saw That Day
 Anti-Magic Academy: The 35th Test Platoon
 Arata: The Legend
 Arc the Lad
 Arcana
 The Asterisk War
 Asura Cryin'
 Atelier Escha & Logy: Alchemists of the Dusk Sky
 Attack on Titan
 Aura Battler Dunbine
 Ayakashi

B
 Babel II
 Baccano!
 Basilisk
 Bastard!!
The Beast Player Erin
 Beet the Vandel Buster
 Belle
 Berserk
 Beyond the Boundary (Kyōkai no Kanata)
 Big Order
 Bikini Warriors
 Black Blood Brothers
 Black Butler
 Black Clover
 Black God (Kuro Kami)
 Blade of the Immortal
 Black Rock Shooter
 Bleach
 Blood-C
 Blood Reign: Curse of the Yoma
 Bludgeoning Angel Dokuro-Chan
 Blue Blink
Blue Exorcist
 Blue Dragon
 Boogiepop Phantom
 Bottle Fairy  (Binzume Yōsei)
 Busou Renkin

C
 Cardcaptor Sakura
 Cardfight!! Vanguard
 Ceres, Celestial Legend
 A Certain Magical Index (Toaru Majutsu no Indekkusu)
 Chainsaw Man
 Charlotte
 Children Who Chase Lost Voices
 Chrome Shelled Regios
 Clannad
 Claymore
 Creamy Mami, the Magic Angel

D
 D.Gray-man
 D.N.Angel
 Da Capo
 Da Capo II
 Da Capo III
 Damekko Dōbutsu
 Date A Live
 Death Note
 Death Parade
 Deltora Quest
 Demon Slayer
 Descendants of Darkness (Yami no Matsuei)
 Detatoko Princess
 Di Gi Charat
 Dinosaur King
 Dog Days
 Dragon Ball
 Dragon Ball Z
 Dragon Ball Super
 Dragon Crisis!
 Dragon Drive
 Dragon Half
 Dragon Quest
 Dragon Quest: Dai no Daibōken
 Dragon Quest: Emblem of Roto
 Dragon's Dogma
 Dragonaut: The Resonance
 Dream Eater Merry (Yumekui Merī)
 Dream Hunter REM
 Dusk Maiden of Amnesia

E
 Earth Maiden Arjuna (Chikyū Shōjo Arujuna)
 Eden's Bowy
 El-Hazard
 Elemental Gelade
 Elf Princess Rane (Fairy Princess Ren)
 Endride
 Escaflowne

F
 Fairy Tail
 Fancy Lala (Mahō no Stage Fancy Lala)
 Fate/kaleid liner Prisma Illya
 Fate Last Encore
 Fate/stay night
 Fate/Zero
 Fighting Foodons
 Final Fantasy: Legend of the Crystals
 Final Fantasy: Unlimited
 Final Fantasy VII: Last Order
 Fire Emblem
 Flame of Recca (Rekka no Honō)
 Fruits Basket
 Full Moon o Sagashite (In Search of the Full Moon)
 Fullmetal Alchemist (Hagane no Renkinjutsushi)
 Fullmetal Alchemist: Brotherhood
 Fushigi Yûgi (Fushigi Yûgi: The Mysterious Play)
 Fushigiboshi no Futagohime (Twin Princesses of the Wonder Planet)
 Futari wa Pretty Cure

G
 Gate
 Gate Keepers
 Gensomaden Saiyuki
 Ghost Slayers Ayashi (Tenpō Ibun Ayakashi Ayashi)
 Go! Princess PreCure
 Glitter Force
 Glitter Force Doki Doki
 Goblin Slayer
 Grander Musashi
 Grimgar of Fantasy and Ash
 Ground Defense Force! Mao-chan
 Guilty Crown
 Guin Saga

H
 Haibane Renmei
 Hakushaku to Yōsei
 Earl and Fairy

 Haikyu
 Hans Christian Andersen's The Little Mermaid
 Happiness!
 HappinessCharge PreCure!
 Hare Tokidoki Buta (Tokyo Pig)
 HeartCatch PreCure!
 Hellsing
 Heroic Age
 Heroic Legend of Arslan
 Hetalia: Axis Powers
 High School DxD
 Hiiro no Kakera
 Hime-sama Goyōjin
 Himitsu no Akko-chan
 xxxHolic
 Howl's Moving Castle
 Hoshin Engi (Soul Hunter)
 Hugtto! PreCure
 Hunter × Hunter
 Hyperdimension Neptunia: The Animation (Chōjigen Geimu Neputeyūnu)

I
 I Couldn't Become a Hero, So I Reluctantly Decided to Get a Job. (Yu-Shibu, Yūsha ni Narenakatta Ore wa Shibushibu Shūshoku o Ketsui Shimashita)
 Inari, Konkon, Koi Iroha
 Inuyasha
 Inukami!
 Inu x Boku SS (Inu x Boku Secret Service)
 Is It Wrong to Try to Pick Up Girls in a Dungeon?
 Ixion Saga DT

J
 Jing: King of Bandits
 Jewelpet
 JoJo's Bizarre Adventure
 Junkers Come Here
 Jujutsu Kaisen

K
 Mekakucity Actors
 Kagihime Monogatari Eikyū Alice Rondo
 Kamichama Karin
 Kamisama Kiss (Kamisama Hajimemashita)
 Kekkaishi
 Kanon
 Kiba
 Kiki's Delivery Service (Majo no Takkyūbin)
 Kirakira PreCure a la Mode
 Kirby: Right Back at Ya! (Hoshi no Kirby)
 Kobato.
 Koi suru Tenshi Angelique
 KonoSuba
 kuroko no basket
 Kuromajo-san ga Toru!!
 Kyo Kara Maoh!
 Kakegurui

L
 Legend of Crystania
 The Legend of Snow White
 Legendz
 Lilpri
 Little Busters!
 Little Witch Academia
 Little Nemo: Adventures In Slumberland (1989 American & Japanese collaboration)
 A Little Snow Fairy Sugar (Chitchana Yukitsukai Shugā)
 Living for the Day After Tomorrow (Asatte no Hōkō)
 Log Horizon
 Lord Marksman and Vanadis
 Loveless

M
 Maburaho
 Made in Abyss
 Magi: The Labyrinth of Magic
 Magi: The Kingdom of Magic
 Magic Knight Rayearth
 Magic User's Club (Mahō Tsukai Tai!)
 Magical Canan
 Magical Girl Lyrical Nanoha
 Magical Girl Lyrical Nanoha A's
 Magical Girl Lyrical Nanoha Strikers
 Magical Meow Meow Taruto
 Magical Princess Minky Momo
 Magical Warfare (Mahō Sensō)
 Magikano
 Maho Girls PreCure!
 Mahōjin Guru Guru
 Makai Senki Disgaea
 Mamotte! Lollipop
 Mamotte Shugogetten
 Maoyu
 MapleStory
 MAQUIA: When the Promised Flower Blooms (Sayonara no Asa ni Yakusoku no Hana o Kazarō)
 MÄR (Märchen Awakens Romance)
 Maria the Virgin Witch
 Master of Epic: The Animation Age
 Maze
 Megami Paradise
 Mermaid Melody Pichi Pichi Pitch
 Mirmo!
 Miss Kobayashi's Dragon Maid (Kobayashi-san Chi no Maidragon)
 Miyuki-chan in Wonderland
 Mob Psycho 100
 Moeyo Ken (Kidō Shinsengumi Moeyo Ken)
 Mon Colle Knights
 Monogatari (series)
 Monster Musume
 Moriarty the Patriot
 Moribito: Guardian of the Spirit (Seirei no Moribito)
 The Morose Mononokean
 Munto
 Murder Princess
 Muromi-san
 Mushishi
 My Bride Is a Mermaid (Seto no Hanayome)
 My Hero Academia
 My-HiME
 My Neighbor Totoro (Tonari no Totoro)
 My-Otome
 Myriad Colors Phantom World
 Mysterious Thief Saint Tail (Kaitō Seinto Tēru)

N
 Naruto
 Naruto Shippūden
 Natsume's Book of Friends
 Negima! Magister Negi Magi
 Neo Ranga
 Night Wizard!
 Nura: Rise of the Yokai Clan
 Nurse Witch Komugi
 No Game No Life
 Noragami

O
 Ōban Star-Racers
 Oh My Goddess! (Aa! Megamisama!)
 Ojamajo Doremi (Magical DoReMi)
 Ojarumaru
 Oku-sama wa Mahō Shōjo: Bewitched Agnes
 Omishi Magical Theater: Risky Safety
 One Piece
 One-Punch Man
 Otogi-Jūshi Akazukin
 Outlaw Star
 Overlord

P
 Pandora Hearts
 Panzer World Galient
 Persona 4: The Animation
 Petite Princess Yucie (Puchi Puri Yucie)
 Petopeto-san
 Pita-Ten
 Pixie Pop
 Pokémon
 Pom Poko (Heisei Tanuki Gassen Ponpoko)
 Ponyo (Gake no Ue no Ponyo)
 Popotan
 Prétear (Shin Shirayuki-hime Densetsu Purītia)
 Pretty Cure (Futari wa Precure)
 Princess Mononoke (Mononoke-hime)
 Princess Tutu
 Prism Ark
 Puella Magi Madoka Magica

Q
 Queen's Blade
 Queen's Blade Rebellion

R
 Rage of Bahamut: Genesis (Shingeki no Bahamut Genesis)
 Ragnarok the Animation
 Rakudai Kishi no Cavalry
 Rakugo Tennyo Oyui
 Ranma ½
 Rave Master
 Record of Lodoss War
 Renkin 3-kyū Magical? Pokān
 Rental Magica
 Revolutionary Girl Utena (Shoujo Kakumei Utena)
 Re:Zero kara Hajimeru Isekai Seikatsu
 RG Veda
 Romeo × Juliet
 Ronin Warriors (Yoroiden Samurai Troopers)
 Rozen Maiden
 Ruin Explorers (Hikyou Tanken ...)
 Rune Soldier (Magical Soldier Louie)
 Rosario + Vampire

S
 Sailor Moon
 Sailor Moon Crystal
 Saint October
 Saint Tail (Kaitou Saint Tail)
 Sakura Wars
 Samurai Champloo
 Samurai Girl: Real Bout High School
 Sanzoku no Musume Rōnya
 Scrapped Princess
 Seisen Cerberus
 Seraph of the End
 Seven Deadly Sins
 Shakugan no Shana
 Shamanic Princess
 Shattered Angels (Kyōshirō to Towa no Sora)
 Shigofumi: Letters from the Departed
 Shin Angyo Onshi
 Shining Tears X Wind
 Shinkyoku Sōkai Polyphonica
 Shugo Chara!
 Shuffle!
 Sisters of Wellber
 Slayers
 Smile PreCure! (Smile Pretty Cure!)
 Sola
 Someday's Dreamers
 Sorcerer Hunters
Sorcerous Stabber Orphen: Beginning
Sorcerous Stabber Orphen: Revenge
Sorcerous Stabber Orphen: Wayward Journey (2020)
 Soul Eater
 Spice and Wolf
 Spirited Away (Sen to Chihiro no Kamikakushi)
 Strange Dawn
 Strike the Blood
 Sugar Sugar Rune
 Suite PreCure
 Sword Art Online

T
 Tai-Madō Gakuen 35 Shiken Shōtai
 Tales from Earthsea
 Tales of the Abyss
 Tales of Phantasia: The Animation
 Tales of Symphonia
 Tales of Zestiria the X
 Tatsu no ko Taro (Taro the Dragon Boy)
 Tayutama: Kiss on my Deity
 Tears to Tiara
 Tenbatsu! Angel Rabbie (Heaven's Judgement! XX Angel Rabbie)
 Tenkai Knights
 The Betrayal Knows My Name (Uragiri wa Boku no Namae o Shitteiru)
 The Cat Returns
 The Cosmopolitan Prayers
 The Devil Is a Part-Timer!
 The Familiar of Zero (Zero no Tsukaima)
 The Great Adventure of Horus, Prince of the Sun
 The Good Witch of the West
 The Heroic Legend of Arslan
 The Irregular at Magic High School
 The Law of Ueki
 The Legend of the Legendary Heroes
 The Melancholy Of Haruhi Suzumiya
 The Mythical Detective Loki Ragnarok
 The Pilot's Love Song
 The Promised Neverland
 The Rising of the Shield Hero
 The Sea Prince and the Fire Child
 The Seven Deadly Sins
 The Severing Crime Edge
 The Snow Queen
 The Story of Saiunkoku (Saiunkoku Monogatari)
 The Testament of Sister New Devil
 The Tower of Druaga
 The Twelve Kingdoms (Jūni Kokuki)
 The Vision of Escaflowne
 The Weakest Tamer Began a Journey to Pick Up Trash
 The World God Only Knows
 The World Is Still Beautiful (Soredemo Sekai wa Utsukushii)
 Those Who Hunt Elves
 Tōka Gettan
 Tokyo Mew Mew
 Tokyo Babylon
 Tokyo Ghoul
 Tokyo Ravens
 Trigun
 Trinity Seven
 Tsubasa: Reservoir Chronicle
 Tweeny Witches (Mahou Shoujo Tai Arusu)
 Tokyo Revengers
toilet bound hanako-kun

U
 Unbreakable Machine-Doll (Mashin-Dōru wa Kizutsukanai)
 Unico
 Unlimited Fafnir
 Ushio and Tora
 Uta Kata
 Utawarerumono

V
 Violinist of Hameln
 Violet Evergarden

W
 Wedding Peach (Ai Tenshi Densetsu Wedingu Pīchi)
 When Supernatural Battles Became Commonplace
 Windaria
 Wind: A Breath of Heart
 Witch Craft Works
 Witch Hunter Robin
 Wizard Barristers
 Wolf Children (Ōkami Kodomo no Ame to Yuki)
 Wolf's Rain

X
 X/1999 (X)

Y
 Yami to Bōshi to Hon no Tabibito (Darkness, the Hat, and the Travelers of the Books, Yamibō)
 Yo-Kai Watch
 Yoshinaga-san Chi no Gargoyle
 Yōtōden
 Yumeria
 Ys
 Yu-Gi-Oh!
 Yu-Gi-Oh! GX
 Yu-Gi-Oh! 5D's
 Yu-Gi-Oh! Zexal
 Yu-Gi-Oh! Arc-V
 Yu-Gi-Oh! VRAINS
 Yu-Gi-Oh! Sevens
 Yurikuma Arashi
 Yu Yu Hakusho

Z
 Zatch Bell! (Konjiki no Gash Bell!!)
 Zenki (Kishin Dōji Zenki)

See also
 Categories: Fantasy, magical girl, and supernatural anime and manga

References

 Bibliography
 
  

 
Fantasy
Anime